Jürgen Tonkel (born 23 August 1962) is a German actor.

Filmography 

 1985: Blam! - Bruno
 1988: Büro, Büro
 1990: Das einfache Glück - Frank
 1990: Sekt oder Selters
 1990: Werner – Beinhart! - Landadeliger
 1991: Freispiel - Paul
 1992: Die Distel
 1996: Der Trip – Die nackte Gitarre 0,5
 1996:  - Policeman
 1999: Medicopter 117 – Jedes Leben zählt - Ex-Polizist Woratz
 1999: Zum Sterben schön
 1999: Midsommar Stories - Dr. Hofmann (segment "Sabotage")
 1999–2016: Tatort - Karl Maurer / Gerlach / Mad gunmen / Michael / Klaus Aigner / Herbert Renz / Axel Gebhardt
 1999–2008: Hausmeister Krause
 2000: Einmal leben - Kellner
 2000: DoppelPack
 2000: Geier im Reisrand - Konrad Heckmann
 2002: Do Fish Do It? - Wolf
 2003–2007: K3 – Kripo Hamburg - Paul Reisinger
 2003–2006: Leipzig Homicide - Rolf Dieter Clausen / Bernd Hofmann
 2004:  - Obermaier
 2004: Sommersturm - Hansi
 2004: Der Untergang - Erich Kempka
 2005: Der Staatsanwalt - Paul Höltgen
 2005:  - Herr Jäger
 2005: Rose - Jürgen Weber
 2006: Grave Decisions (Wer früher stirbt ist länger tot) - Alfred
 2006: Alarm für Cobra 11 - Pokorny
 2008: Spiel mir das Lied und du bist tot! - Jerry-Lee-Larry
 2008:  - Kommandant Brandmaier
 2008: Ihr könnt euch niemals sicher sein - Thomas Rother
 2008: Machen wir’s auf Finnisch - Carlo Schneider
 2008:  - Der Heilige Nantwein
 2008: Stolberg - Polizeihauptmeister Achim Lorentz
 2009: All You Need Is Love – Meine Schwiegertochter ist ein Mann - Christian Remminger
 2010: SOKO Donau - Robert Hanser
 2010–2017: Die Rosenheim-Cops - Karl Schretzmayer 
 2010: Die Hummel - Pit
 2010: Das Haus ihres Vaters - Rolf Bartels
 2010: Franzi
 2011: Lessons of a Dream (Der ganz große Traum) - Dr. Jessen
 2011: Rookie – Fast platt - Mickrig
 2011:  - Hauptkommissar Johann Ostler
 2012:  - Franz Much
 2012–2017: Die Chefin - Inspector Paul Böhmer
 2012: Die Braut im Schnee - Kai Döring
 2012: Pension Freiheit - Feuerwehrkommandant
 2012:  - Bestatter Möslang
 2012: Polizeiruf 110 – Fieber
 2013: V8 – Du willst der Beste sein - Sam Kamschik

References

External links 
 

1962 births
Living people
German male television actors
German male film actors
German male stage actors